Noita is a platform roguelite game developed by Nolla Games. Players control a sorcerer that can create and cast spells in order to defeat enemies named after Finnish mythological creatures. The game takes place in a 2D world with procedurally generated areas where every pixel is physically simulated. It was released in early access for Microsoft Windows on 24 September 2019. Noita left early access as the 1.0 version was released on 15 October 2020.

Gameplay
The player character in Noita is a sorcerer who creates and casts spells in a procedurally generated 2D world where every pixel is physically simulated. Noita has permadeath, and the player fights enemies that include creatures named after Finnish mythological creatures such as Hiisi and Iku-Turso. The story opens with a cutscene that references the Karelian and Finnish national epic Kalevala, and one of the goals is seeking out the Sampo.

Noita is a single-player video game but contains a viewer participation feature that lets Twitch livestream viewers vote about in-game events.

Development
Noita was developed by Nolla Games, an independent game studio based in Helsinki, Finland. The studio was formed by Petri Purho (the developer of Crayon Physics Deluxe), Olli Harjola (The Swapper) and Arvi Teikari (Baba Is You). Noita is inspired by the 1998 artillery game Liero, falling-sand games, and modern roguelikes. The game's sound design was by Niilo Takalainen, and the soundtrack was a collaboration between the Finnish psychedelic band From Grotto and Niilo Takalainen. The game went through many different design directions for two years, before settling on the final format. Petri Purho described it as "based on a falling sand style simulation. Essentially, it's complex cellular automata."

Noita was released in early access for Microsoft Windows on 24 September 2019 and is digitally distributed on GOG.com, Humble Bundle, Itch.io, and Steam. The developer expected the game to be in early access for a year before its full release. Noita left early access as the 1.0 version on 15 October 2020.

The game received post release content updates until 30 March 2021 with the release of the “Epilogue Update”, however the developers stated they would still release bug fix patches. They also highlighted the game's modding community.

Reception

Noita was a finalist nominee in three categories at the 2019 Independent Games Festival: Seumas McNally Grand Prize, Excellence in Design, and Nuovo Award. Finnish computing website  gave the early access version of Noita a 4 out of 5, and described the game as "unbridled and addictive" and that it "sets high expectations for the finished game". The game was nominated for "Best Technology" at the 20th Game Developers Choice Awards, held in March 2020 and for "Most Innovative Gameplay" in the Steam Awards (2020). Noita won 2 awards in the Finnish Game Awards 2021, for Finnish Game of the Year and Big Screen Game of the Year.

The Finnish Museum of Games hosted an exhibition about the game from 4 September until 12 December 2021.

References

External links
 
 Noita at MobyGames
 

Indie video games
Roguelike video games
Single-player video games
Lua (programming language)-scripted video games
Video games developed in Finland
Windows-only games
Platform games
Side-scrolling video games
2020 video games
Windows games
Video games about witchcraft
Video games using procedural generation
Video games based on Finno-Ugric mythology
Works based on the Kalevala
Video games designed by Arvi Teikari